Nathalie Bioko Makongi, known as Nathalie Bioko, is a DR Congolese footballer. She has been a member of the DR Congo women's national team.

Club career
Bioko has played for Grand Hôtel in the Democratic Republic of the Congo.

International career
Bioko was capped for the DR Congo at senior level during the 2006 African Women's Championship.

See also
 List of Democratic Republic of the Congo women's international footballers

References

External links

Year of birth missing (living people)
Living people
Democratic Republic of the Congo women's footballers
Democratic Republic of the Congo women's international footballers
Women's association footballers not categorized by position